Amanda Fallon is a 1973 American television pilot directed by Jack Laird and starring Jane Wyman which was produced as a spin-off of The Bold Ones: The New Doctors (1969–1973) that was never picked up as a series.

Plot
Dr. Amanda Fallon (Jane Wyman) becomes involved with the problems of a teenage girl — an accident victim who is also from a broken home and pregnant.

Cast
Jane Wyman  ... Dr. Amanda Fallon
Laurie Prange 	... 	Joyce Cummings
Kathleen Nolan 	... 	Carol Steadman
Leslie Nielsen  ... Mr. Cummings
Pat O'Brien 	... 	Emory
David Fresco ... 	Hertz
Miko Mayama 	... 	Irene Watanbe
Eric Chase  ... Washburn

External links

1973 American television episodes
Television films as pilots
Television pilots not picked up as a series
Films scored by Dave Grusin
Teenage pregnancy in film
NBC original programming